Maa Pratyangira Kalika Alayam is a temple located in Moranapalli, Hosur, Tamil Nadu. It has the biggest Pratyangira statue and it is on the rajagopuram on the temple. The temple has many people in the weekends and on weekdays. The temple worships Pratyangira, Sarabeswara, Narasimha, and Mariamman.

Inside the temple, there is a long waiting until you get inside the temple. The temple then has Simha's mouth open wide where the people worship. People worship Pratyangira by putting garlands and setting Vilakku (ghee lamp) under Pratyangira's feet.

Gallery

See also 
List of temples in Tamil Nadu
Bannari Amman Temple

References 
 http://wikimapia.org/30962228/Sri-Maha-Pratyangira-KalikaDevi-Alayam-Sri-Abaya-Narasimmhaswamy-Thirukkoil-Hosur
 Pratyangira#Temples

Hindu temples in Krishnagiri district